% Arabica, also known as % ΔRΔBICΔ, is a specialty coffee chain brand based in Kyoto, Japan.

Company history 
The coffee brand was founded by Kenneth Shoji. After the Tōhoku earthquake destroyed his house in Fukushima Prefecture in 2011, he moved to Hong Kong. As soon as he decided to start a coffee business, he went to Hawaii and purchased a coffee farm. In 2013, Shoji opened the first % Arabica café in Hong Kong. In 2014, % Arabica opened its worldwide flagship store in the Kyoto’s historic Higashiyama district. The coffee brand is known for using its custom-made espresso machines, manufactured in Seattle, that provide baristas with more control while creating craft drinks.

% Arabica was described as "Japan's cult-favorite hit coffee shop" by Eater.

% Arabica’s stores focus on having a clean, minimalist style fitting the Japanese design principles of simple beauty while having local design elements inspired by the countries in which they are based. Founder Kenneth has collaborated with several architects and design studios such as B.L.U.E. Architecture, Ciguë, Nendo, Precht, and Puddle.

As of 2022, the chain has over 126 locations worldwide including United Kingdom, United States, Indonesia, Qatar, China, Canada, Bahrain, Malaysia, Morocco, Kuwait, United Arab Emirates, Japan, France, Singapore, Cambodia, Philippines, Thailand and Oman. The four GCC % Arabica franchise of Kuwait, Bahrain, Kingdom of Saudi Arabia & Qatar are all under Nejoud Restaurant Management with their head office based in Kuwait City, Kuwait and have all been receiving their roasted coffee from the Kuwait_Shuwaikh roastery until recent in July 2022 Saudi Arabia officially opened her roastery. All 110 existing locations of % Arabica are all franchise operations, except for the three in Kyoto.

In August 2022, % Arabica opened its first store in Taiwan located at the foot of Taipei Elephant Mountain and the first Bali store at Kuta Beachwalk Mall. It is the first % Arabica store to forgo the usage of plastic cups, a standard that all % Arabica stores to follow in the future.

In 2022, during The London Coffee Festival, % Arabica won the “Most Notable New Cafe” award in the UK Coffee Awards 2022.

Gallery

References

External links
 Official Website

Japanese drinks
Coffee softdrinks
Coffee brands